Stefan Bell (born 24 August 1991) is a German footballer who plays as a centre back for Bundesliga club Mainz 05.

Playing career
In his early years, Bell played in the Jugendspielgemeinschaft Wehr/Rieden/Volkesfeld and afterwards he switched to the TuS Mayen. In 2007, he started playing in the youth team of 1. FSV Mainz 05.
He started his professional career on 29 August 2010 with 1. FSV Mainz 05 where he is currently playing.

References

External links

 Profile at the 1. FSV Mainz 05 website 
 
 
 Stefan Bell at eintracht-archiv.de 

1991 births
Living people
People from Andernach
German footballers
Footballers from Rhineland-Palatinate
1. FSV Mainz 05 II players
1. FSV Mainz 05 players
TSV 1860 Munich players
Eintracht Frankfurt players
Bundesliga players
2. Bundesliga players
Germany under-21 international footballers
Germany youth international footballers
Association football defenders
TuS Mayen players